Carinodrillia mamona is a species of sea snail, a marine gastropod mollusk in the family Pseudomelatomidae, the turrids and allies.

Description
The length of the shell attains 11 mm, its diameter 4.3 mm.

Distribution
This species occurs off Puerto Rico at depths between 60 m and 73 m.

References

 Corea, Lois Fleming. Reports on the Collections Obtained by the First Johnson-Smithsonian Deep-Sea Expedition to the Puerto Rican Deep. New Marine Mollusks, Etc. 1934.

External links
 
 
 Corea, Lois Fleming. "New marine mollusks (with three plates)." (1934).

mamona
Gastropods described in 1934